Gokushovirinae is a subfamily of viruses in the family Microviridae.  There are 8 species in this subfamily, divided among 4 genera.

Species and genera
The following species and genera are assigned to the family:
 Genus: Bdellomicrovirus
 Bdellovibrio virus MAC1
 Bdellovibrio virus MH2K
 Genus: Chlamydiamicrovirus
 Chlamydia virus Chp1
 Chlamydia virus Chp2
 Chlamydia virus CPAR39
 Chlamydia virus CPG1
 Genus: Enterogokushovirus
 Enterogokushovirus EC6098
 Genus: Spiromicrovirus
 Spiroplasma virus SpV4

References

External links
 ICTV

 
Microviridae
Virus subfamilies